The Cumberland and Oxford Canal was opened in 1832 to connect the largest lakes of southern Maine with the seaport of Portland, Maine. The canal followed the Presumpscot River from Sebago Lake through the towns of Standish, Windham, Gorham, and Westbrook. The Canal diverged from the river at Westbrook to reach the navigable Fore River estuary and Portland Harbor. One additional lock was constructed in the Songo River to provide  of additional elevation to reach Long Lake from Sebago Lake. A proposed extension from Harrison to Bear Pond and Tom Pond in Waterford would have required three more locks on the Bear River, but they were never built.

A state lottery was authorized to help raise $50,000 for the project, and the Canal Bank of Portland was chartered in 1825. The canal was completed in 1830 at a cost of $206,000. Lock walls were made of granite masonry with wooden gates at either end. A lock keeper was stationed at each lock to move the lock gates with heavy timber balance beams, manipulate iron valves to adjust water levels within the lock, and collect a 6 cent fee for use of the lock.

Canal boats 
A tow path adjacent to the excavated portions of the canal enabled horses to tow the canal boats while the boatmen steered , or the boats could be moved by poles when the need arose; usually while passing through the Songo lock. Canal boats using the lakes had a  hinged centerboard keel and two hinged masts capable of supporting gaff riggedsails which would be folded down for passage under bridges through the excavated canal. Cargos included lumber, masts, barrel hoops and staves, boxmaking shook, and firewood from the interior to Portland. Apples were an important agricultural product of the area; and Oriental Powder Company mills adjacent to the canal in Windham manufactured nearly 25% of the Union gunpowder supply for the American Civil War. Canal boat passengers were charged one-half cent per mile. A wide variety of manufactured goods moved inland through the canal from Portland. The south end of Long Lake is locally known as Brandy Pond because a barrel of brandy was lost from a canal boat during passage through that part of the waterway.

Railroads and Steamboats 

Some of the Presumpscot River lock facilities were converted to dams for the S. D. Warren Paper Mill. Steamboats continued to use Songo Lock to provide transportation from Sebago Lake Station to the lakeside communities of Bridgton, Harrison, Naples, Sebago, Casco, Raymond and North Windham. The Bridgton and Saco River Railroad reached Bridgton in 1883 and Harrison in 1898. The Sebago Lake, Songo River, and Bay of Naples Steamboat Company continued to offer summer passenger service to tourists until the last steamboat Goodrich burned at its Naples dock in 1932. Songo Lock remains in service for pleasure boats.

Relicensing of the dams was the subject of the 2006 Supreme Court case S. D. Warren Co. v. Maine Board of Environmental Protection.

See also

National Register of Historic Places listings in Cumberland County, Maine
Fore River Sanctuary

Notes

References 
 
 
 
 
 
 
 

Canals in Maine
Canals on the National Register of Historic Places in Maine
Transportation buildings and structures in Cumberland County, Maine
Canals opened in 1832
National Register of Historic Places in Cumberland County, Maine